DNO ASA (OSE: DNO) is a Norwegian oil and gas operator focused on the Middle East and the North Sea. Founded in 1971 and listed on the Oslo Stock Exchange, the Company holds stakes in onshore and offshore licenses at various stages of exploration, development and production in the Kurdistan region of Iraq, Norway, the United Kingdom and Yemen.

About DNO 

DNO is Norway's oldest oil company and the first to list on the Oslo Stock Exchange in 1981. During the last two decades the company's focus has shifted from the North Sea to the Middle East region.

In 2004, DNO was the first international oil company to enter the Kurdistan region of Iraq, at a time when the Kurdish region's oil industry was virtually non-existent. The company began production from its flagship Tawke oil field in Kurdistan in 2007 – just two years after the start of exploration activities. The neighboring Peshkabir field was brought on production in 2018.

DNO is now the leading international operator in Kurdistan in terms of production (more than 110,000 barrels of oil per day in 2017) and reserves (the Tawke and Peshkabir fields together hold more than 500 million barrels of proven and probable reserves).

The company re-entered the North Sea as well in 2017, acquiring offshore exploration licenses in Norway and the United Kingdom. This has since expanded to include the Norwegian Sea and the Barents Sea.

Operations

Kurdistan region of Iraq 
DNO entered the region in 2004 and now has a leading position in reserves and production.

Norway 
DNO re-entered Norway in 2017 through the acquisition of Origo Exploration and now holds twenty-one licenses on the Norwegian Continental Shelf.

United Kingdom 
DNO entered the United Kingdom in 2017 through the acquisition of Origo Exploration and now holds three licenses to the UK Continental Shelf.

Yemen 
DNO entered Yemen in 1998 and was the company's first foray into the Middle East.

Assets

Kurdistan, Iraq

Norway

United Kingdom

Yemen

Board of Directors

Bijan Mossavar-Rahmani - Executive Chairman 
Bijan Mossavar-Rahmani is an experienced oil and gas executive and has served as DNO's Executive Chairman of the Board of Directors since 2011. Mr. Mossavar-Rahmani serves concurrently as Executive Chairman of Oslo-listed RAK Petroleum plc, DNO's largest shareholder. He is a member of the nomination and remuneration committees.

Lars Arne Takla - Deputy Chairman 
Lars Arne Takla has extensive experience from various managerial, executive and board positions in the international oil and gas industry. He was elected to DNO's Board of Directors in 2012 and is a member of the HSSE committee.

Elin Karfjell - Director 
Elin Karfjell is Managing Partner of Aelika AS and has held various management positions across a broad range of industries. Ms. Karfjell was elected to DNO's Board of Directors in 2015 and is a member of the audit committee.

Gunnar Hirsti - Director 
Gunnar Hirsti has executive experience from various managerial, executive and board positions in the oil and gas industry as well as the information technology industry in Norway. He was elected to DNO's Board of Directors in 2007 and is a member of the audit and remuneration committees.

Shelley Watson - Director 
Shelley Watson began her career as a reservoir surveillance and facilities engineer with Esso Australia in its offshore Bass Strait operation. She has served on DNO's Board of Directors since 2010 and is a member of the audit committee.

Criticism from the National Contact Point  

The Norwegian National Contact Point concluded in 2018 that DNO had not met the expectations expressed in the OECD Guidelines on prior notice and consultation with the employees of DNO Yemen in connection with suspension of the company's Yemeni operations in 2015. The key issue in the complaint concerned lack of prior notice and consultation between DNO and the employee representatives in Yemen in connection with collective dismissals and suspension of production in the war-like situation that prevailed in 2015. The complaint also concerned the question of whether DNO had obstructed the workers’ right to organize and collective bargaining in Yemen, and the validity of dismissals as part of the downsizing process.

Industri Energi had for some time tried to help the workers of DNO Yemen after having received desperate appeals from the workers who were sacked by text messages and e-mails when the company withdrew from the country, and not been given the wages and benefits they were entitled to. Still the workers have not received the compensation they legally are entitled to according to court decisions in Yemen.

References

External links

 Norwegian Petroleum Directorate´s fact page on DNO
 Stock information on DNO (from Oslo Børs/Oslo Stock Exchange)

Financial statements and presentations 
 Reports and presentations

Oil companies of Norway
Non-renewable resource companies established in 1971
Companies listed on the Oslo Stock Exchange
Energy companies established in 1971
1971 establishments in Norway
Multinational companies headquartered in Norway